Elton John and Tim Rice's Aida is a 1999 concept album that contains songs from, but predates the main production of, the 2000 musical Aida.

With music by Elton John and lyrics by Tim Rice, the album features Elton John performing the songs along with pop stars Janet Jackson, Tina Turner, Sting, Lenny Kravitz, Shania Twain, Boyz II Men, Spice Girls, James Taylor, LeAnn Rimes, Kelly Price, Lulu, Angelique Kidjo, and Dru Hill. Additionally, two tracks, "A Step Too Far" and "Elaborate Lives", feature the voices of Aida cast-members-to-be Heather Headley and Sherie Rene Scott. The album was certified gold in April 1999 by the RIAA.

Prior to the recordings being performed by other artists, Elton John also recorded each song as a solo full production demo.  These tracks did not make the album and have never been officially released but are readily available on YouTube.

"Written in the Stars" was released as a single, reaching No. 29 on the Billboard Hot 100 and No. 2 on the Adult Contemporary chart. The single was certified gold in April 1999 by the RIAA. "The Messenger" makes its only appearance here, as it would be cut from the Broadway production and consequently left off the cast album.

This record is sometimes known as the "Concept Album" for Aida, both because it came before the production and to distinguish it from the 2000 release of Elton John and Tim Rice's Aida: Original Broadway Cast Recording,  a conventional original cast recording of the Broadway production.

Track listing
 "Another Pyramid" – Sting
 "Written in the Stars" – Elton John/LeAnn Rimes
 "Easy as Life" – Tina Turner featuring Angelique Kidjo
 "My Strongest Suit" – Spice Girls
 "I Know the Truth" – Elton John/Janet Jackson
 "Not Me" – Boyz II Men
 "Amneris' Letter" – Shania Twain
 "A Step Too Far" – Elton John/Heather Headley/Sherie Scott
 "Like Father Like Son" – Lenny Kravitz
 "Elaborate Lives" – Heather Headley
 "How I Know You" – James Taylor
 "The Messenger" – Elton John/Lulu
 "The Gods Love Nubia" – Kelly Price
 "Enchantment Passing Through" – Dru Hill 		
 "Orchestral Finale" – Elton John

Personnel

Additional personnel

Charts

Certifications

References

External links

1998 albums
Elton John albums
Concept albums
Albums produced by Phil Ramone
The Rocket Record Company albums